Stefan Fonselius (born September 19, 1976) is a Finnish ice hockey linesman who works in the SM-liiga. He has also officiated in the ice hockey at the 2010 Winter Olympics. He gained notoriety when he unwittingly took the Gold Medal winning puck home with him to Turku, Finland before delivering it to the IIHF to be authenticated and sent to the Hockey Hall of Fame.

References 

1976 births
Finnish ice hockey officials
Sportspeople from Turku
Living people